Åse Kristin Ask Bakke (born 30 May 1996) is a Norwegian politician.

She was elected representative to the Storting from the constituency of Møre og Romsdal for the period 2021–2025, for the Labour Party.

References

1996 births
Living people
Labour Party (Norway) politicians
Møre og Romsdal politicians
Members of the Storting
Women members of the Storting